Mi-Jung Lee (born September 12, 1966) (born in Chuncheon, Gangwon-do, South Korea) is a Canadian television journalist and news anchor based in Vancouver, British Columbia. She formerly co-anchored the weeknight 6pm newscast alongside Scott Roberts on CTV Vancouver, Roberts has since moved on to CTV Edmonton and Lee is anchoring solo.

Biography
She moved with her family from South Korea to Vancouver at age 4, and graduated from Sir Charles Tupper Secondary School in 1984. She then completed an undergraduate degree in English literature at the University of British Columbia, and later a post-graduate degree in journalism at Ryerson University.

She began her on-air career in 1990 as a reporter and part-time anchor at CHEK-TV in Victoria, then moved to CHAN-TV (BCTV, then CTV's Vancouver affiliate) in 1992 and served in similar capacities, eventually anchoring that station's News Hour Final weeknights until 1998. That year she joined CIVT-TV (then independent station VTV) as 6pm news co-anchor alongside Paul Mennier. When CIVT became a CTV owned-and-operated station as part of the 2001 Vancouver TV realignment, Lee became anchor and producer of the station's 11:30pm newscast. She also briefly co-hosted the Western Canada edition of CTV's national breakfast television program Canada AM from January 2008 until its cancellation in June that year. She returned to CIVT's weeknight 6pm newscast as co-anchor in August 2018, after Mike Killeen and Tamara Taggart were let go from the station earlier that year.

Lee has appeared as a reporter or news anchor in several TV shows and films including Snakes on a Plane, X-Men: The Last Stand, Tron: Legacy, Hot Rod and Watchmen.

Filmography

References

External links
 Profile from CTV British Columbia
 
 Canada AM Returns to its Original Format beginning Monday, June 9

1966 births
Living people
Canadian television news anchors
Canadian women television journalists
CTV Television Network people
People from Vancouver
Toronto Metropolitan University alumni
South Korean emigrants to Canada
University of British Columbia alumni